Erik Robert Christensen, Jr. (October 31, 1931 - March 18. 2022) was an American football defensive end who played professionally for the National Football League (NFL) for the Washington Redskins.  He played college football at the University of Richmond and was selected in the seventh round of the 1955 NFL Draft.

Christensen played high school football at Woodbridge High School in Woodbridge Township, New Jersey, before transferring to Fork Union Military Academy.

Christensen died on March 18. 2022, at the age of 90.

References

1931 births
2022 deaths
American football defensive ends
Richmond Spiders football players
Washington Redskins players
Woodbridge High School (New Jersey) alumni
Sportspeople from Elizabeth, New Jersey
Players of American football from New Jersey